

Richard Schimpf (16 May 1897 – 30 December 1972) was a paratroop general in the Luftwaffe of Nazi Germany during World War II. He was a recipient of the Knight's Cross of the Iron Cross. On 8 March 1945, he negotiated a surrender to American troops at Bad Godesberg, handing himself and the city over without a shot being fired. He joined the post war West German Air Force in 1957 and retired in 1962 as a Generalmajor.

Awards and decorations

 Clasp to the Iron Cross (1939) 2nd Class (5 August 1940) & 1st Class (17 February 1941)

 Knight's Cross of the Iron Cross on 6 October 1944 as Generalleutnant and commander of 3. Fallschirmjäger Division  
 Order of Merit of the Federal Republic of Germany

References

Citations

Bibliography

 
 

1897 births
1972 deaths
People from Rottal-Inn
People from the Kingdom of Bavaria
Bundeswehr generals
Fallschirmjäger of World War II
German Army personnel of World War I
Luftwaffe World War II generals
Recipients of the clasp to the Iron Cross, 1st class
Recipients of the Gold German Cross
Recipients of the Knight's Cross of the Iron Cross
Grand Crosses with Star and Sash of the Order of Merit of the Federal Republic of Germany
German prisoners of war in World War II held by the United Kingdom
German prisoners of war in World War II held by the United States
Reichswehr personnel
Military personnel from Bavaria
Lieutenant generals of the Luftwaffe
Major generals of the German Army